KOBB may refer to:

 KOBB (AM), a radio station (1230 AM) licensed to Bozeman, Montana, United States
 KOBB-FM, a radio station (93.7 FM) licensed to Bozeman, Montana, United States